Kushk-e Mur (also Romanized as Kūshk-e Mūr and Kūshk Mūr; also known as Kūsh Kūmūr) is a village in Mardehek Rural District, Jebalbarez-e Jonubi District, Anbarabad County, Kerman Province, Iran. At the 2006 census, its population was 1,175, in 258 families.

References 

Populated places in Anbarabad County